"Down in the Alley" is a song released as a single by The Clovers in 1957.

Elvis Presley recorded it in 1966. His version was included as a bonus track on his 1966 soundtrack album Spinout.

Writing 
The song is credited to Jesse Stone and the Clovers.
The version recorded by Ronnie Hawkins is credited to S. (Solomon) Burke, B.(Burt) Berns, B. Marvin (Babe Chivian), C. (Joseph) Martin.

Recordings and releases

Elvis Presley version 
Presley recorded it between 4 and 7 AM in the early morning of May 26, 1966 at the May 25—28 studio sessions for RCA at the RCA Studio B in Nashville, Tennessee.

With Bob Dylan cover "Tomorrow Is a Long Time" from the same session, "Down in the Alley" was included as a bonus track on the Spinout soundtrack album.

Track listing

The Clovers version 
7" single (1957)
 Down in the Alley (Clovers, Jesse Stone) — 2:18
 There's No Tomorrow (Hoffman, Corday, Carr) — 2:45

References

External links 
 The Clovers - Down in the Alley at Discogs
 The Clovers - Down In The Alley (song) at Ultratop.be

1957 songs
The Clovers songs
Elvis Presley songs
Songs written by Jesse Stone